Biritinga is a municipality in Bahia, Brazil.

References

Municipalities in Bahia